Chérif Baba Aidara (born 22 November 1967) is a Mauritanian middle-distance runner.

Aidara competed in two Summer Olympics, at the 1992 Summer Olympics he entered the 800 metres and finished 6th out of eight runners in his heat, so didn't qualify for next round, he didn't fare much better again in the 800 metres at the 1996 Summer Olympics where this time he finished 7th in his heat and didn't qualify again for the next round. He also competed at the 1997 World Championships in Athletics in the 800 metres where he came last in his heat and didn't advance to the next round.

References

1967 births
Living people
Olympic athletes of Mauritania
Athletes (track and field) at the 1992 Summer Olympics
Athletes (track and field) at the 1996 Summer Olympics
Mauritanian male middle-distance runners